Leopold Horner (24 August 1911 – 5 October 2005) was a German chemist who published a modified Wittig reaction using phosphonate-stabilized carbanions now called the Horner–Wadsworth–Emmons reaction  (HWE reaction) or  Horner-Wittig reaction.

Life
Horner started studying chemistry at the University of Heidelberg and later with Heinrich Wieland at the University of Munich. After he received his Ph.D and his habilitation he worked at the Polymer Research Institute in Frankfurt. In 1953 he became professor at the University of Mainz.

References
  

 Ansprachen auf der Chemiedozententagung 2005 in München

1911 births
2005 deaths
Heidelberg University alumni
Ludwig Maximilian University of Munich alumni
Academic staff of Johannes Gutenberg University Mainz
20th-century German chemists
People from Kehl